O.P. Dutta (1922 – 9 February 2012) was an Indian filmmaker and writer. He began his career in 1948, as director for the film, 'Pyar Ki Jeet', which starred actress-singer, Suraiya. The film catapulted her to a 'Super Star' sensation. He directed nine films until 1959, after which he got into writing dialogues, scripts and stories for films. He wrote most of the films for his director son, J.P. Dutta, notably Border and LOC Kargil. In 2001, he won the International Indian Film Academy Award and the Filmfare Award for the film Refugee. In 2006, he won a Lifetime Achievement Award from Filmfare. Dutta died from pneumonia in Mumbai on 9 February 2012. He was 90.

O.P also made a film in Karachi post independence in the early 1950s, called 'Anokhi', and further helped build a studio in that city. He wrote scripts/dialogues for the films 'Mastana' ( *Mehmood Vinod Khanna ), 'Jeet' (* Randhir Kapoor Babita ), 'Chirag' (* Sunil Dutt, Asha Parekh) and 'Do Raaste' (* Rajesh Khanna, Mumtaz), among others. He did not figure in the credits due to differences with Raj Khosla, who insisted on him sharing credits with another writer.

OP Dutta was the father of J.P. Dutta, producer and director of Indian films, and father-in-law of former actress Bindiya Goswami.

Filmography
Umrao Jaan (2006) - writer
LOC: Kargil (2003) - writer
Refugee (2000) - writer
Border (1997) - writer
Kshatriya (1993) - writer
Hathyar (1989) - writer
Yateem (1988) - writer
Ghulami (1985) - writer
Aangan (1959)- director
Hulare (1957) - director
Lagan (1955) - director
Malkin (1953) - director
Parbat (1952) - director
Ek Nazar (1951) - director
Surajmukhi (1950) - director
Hamari Manzil (1949) - director
Pyaar Ki Jeet (1948) - director

References

External links 

1922 births
2012 deaths
Deaths from pneumonia in India
Hindi-language film directors
20th-century Indian film directors
Indian male screenwriters
Film directors from Mumbai
Punjabi people